Otter Creek is a town in Levy County, Florida, United States. The population was 134 at the 2010 census.

Geography

Demographics

As of the census of 2000, there were 121 people, 54 households, and 32 families residing in the town. The racial makeup of the town was 93.39% White, 3.31% African American, 2.48% from other races, and 0.83% from two or more races. Hispanic or Latino of any race were 4.96% of the population.

There were 54 households, out of which 22.2% had children under the age of 18 living with them, 51.9% were married couples living together, 3.7% had a female householder with no husband present, and 40.7% were non-families. 31.5% of all households were made up of individuals, and 14.8% had someone living alone who was 65 years of age or older. The average household size was 2.24 and the average family size was 2.91.

In the town, the population was spread out, with 17.4% under the age of 18, 7.4% from 18 to 24, 20.7% from 25 to 44, 37.2% from 45 to 64, and 17.4% who were 65 years of age or older. The median age was 46 years. For every 100 females, there were 108.6 males. For every 100 females age 18 and over, there were 100.0 males.

The median income for a household in the town was $18,036, and the median income for a family was $19,821. Males had a median income of $30,000 versus $22,500 for females. The per capita income for the town was $13,101. There were 12.1% of families and 20.2% of the population living below the poverty line, including no under eighteens and 17.2% of those over 64.

History
Hernando de Soto crossed Otter Creek during his explorations of Florida in 1539.

In the 1930s and 1940s, Otter Creek was the second largest community in Levy County, with a population approaching 1,000.

The loss of a lumber mill that made cypress "flitches" for citrus crates and the discontinuation of two railroads which bisected the town led to a steady population decline.

In 2007, the town council created a local historic district consisting of neighborhoods with "company town" residences that date from the 19th and early 20th century

After the closure of the lumber mill, there has been very little business or commercial activity within Otter Creek. By 2019, only two small businesses remained, an independently-owned convenience store (no gasoline) located at the intersection of Highways 19 and 24, and the Creekside Christian School, a private, primary school operating on the grounds of Otter Creek Baptist Church.

To the extent that other businesses existed, they have closed due to the deaths of their owners or otherwise failed.  Some notable examples were the Smith Store and the Country Store, both community-centric and vibrant in their days.  The Smith Store was operated by Ella Graham (deceased 1996), whose grandson once delivered groceries and dry goods to the town residents on a Shetland pony.  The Country Store, originally built and operated by Junior and Philene Williams, changed hands after their deaths, but permanently closed about 2000.  There was an animal hide tannery until about 1980, and a few bait shops and convenience stores. The remnants of nearly all are now decrepit.

References

Towns in Levy County, Florida
Towns in Florida
Former census-designated places in Florida